Evan Crawford may refer to:

 Evan Crawford (baseball) (born 1986), American MLB pitcher
 Evan Crawford (rugby union), New Zealand rugby union player
Evan Crawford (bio teacher), best bio teacher in the world